Leonard Martin Kravitz (August 8, 1930 – March 7, 1951) was an American soldier in the United States Army who served in the Korean War. He is a posthumous recipient of the Medal of Honor.

Early life and family
Leonard Kravitz was born and raised in Brooklyn, New York. His parents were Jean (Kaufman) and Joseph Kravitz.

Private Kravitz was the younger brother of filmmaker and TV producer Sy Kravitz and uncle of popular musician Lenny Kravitz.

Medal of Honor
On March 6/7, 1951, Kravitz' unit's positions at Jipyeong-ri were overrun by the enemy. Kravitz voluntarily operated a machine-gun position, forcing the enemy to direct its efforts against him and helping his comrades to retreat at the cost of his own life.

Kravitz was reported to have shouted to his comrades, "Get the hell out of here while you can!"  When American troops retook their position, they found that Kravitz had killed a large number of enemy soldiers before dying in action.

The award was made as a result of the National Defense Authorization Act of 2002 which called for a review of Jewish American and Hispanic American veterans of World War II, the Korean War and the Vietnam War to ensure that no prejudice was shown to those deserving the Medal of Honor. The re-examination of the Medal of Honor process was pursued for over half a century by Mitchel Libman, who had been Kravitz's childhood friend from Crown Heights, Brooklyn.  Libman's research led him to conclude that a number of Jewish recipients of the Distinguished Service Cross should have been nominated for the Medal of Honor instead.  After decades of lobbying, Libman convinced Representative Robert Wexler to propose the "Leonard Kravitz Jewish War Veterans Act of 2001". The legislation was ultimately not adopted, but its consideration led Congress to direct the armed forces to re-examine past practices in selecting Medal of Honor recipients.  When the decision was made in 2012 to award the Medal of Honor to Kravitz, President Obama phoned Libman personally to inform him.

Awards and decorations

Medal of Honor citation
'''

References

See also
 List of Korean War Medal of Honor recipients

1930 births
1951 deaths
American military personnel killed in the Korean War
Jewish Medal of Honor recipients
People from Brooklyn
United States Army Medal of Honor recipients
United States Army soldiers
Korean War recipients of the Medal of Honor
American people of Ukrainian-Jewish descent
United States Army personnel of the Korean War
20th-century American Jews